One Hundred Years Ago is a 1911 Australian silent film directed by Gaston Mervale. It features an early screen performance from Louise Lovely (billed as "Louise Carbasse") and is considered a lost film.

Plot
The movie was billed as "an Anglo-Australian romantic drama". Jasper Hugh Lovel is sent to prison at Norfolk Island for a crime he did not commit. A woman in England who loves him manages to secure his pardon and they are reunited.

Cast
Louise Carbasse as Judith (in love with Lovel)
Harrie Ireland as Katharine (a burglar's wife)
A.J. Patrick as Lovel (a young squire)
Godfrey Cass as Captain Ridd (his rival)
Alf Scarlett as an Old Jew (a receiver of stolen goods)
James Martin as a magistrate
Harry Beaumont as a Burglar

Production
The film was shot at Australian Life Biograph's factory in Manly, New South Wales. Unlike many Australian films of the time, it was an original script, not based on a play.  The author was Patrick William Marony.

The story is founded on fact.  In an old cell at Norfolk Island may be seen the following inscription: "I, Jasper Hugh Lovel, here proclaim, before God and man, I am innocent. May God avenge me on mine enemy."

References

External links

One Hundred Years Ago at National Film and Sound Archive

1911 films
Australian drama films
Australian silent short films
Australian black-and-white films
Lost Australian films
1911 drama films
1911 lost films
Lost drama films
Films directed by Gaston Mervale
Silent drama films